KMFY-FM (96.9 FM) is a radio station licensed to Grand Rapids, Minnesota. KMFY covers the counties of Itasca, Aitkin, Cass and western St. Louis. KMFY broadcasts local weather, sports, local news, and community events.

History
Originally KXGR, the radio station was sold to Bill and Carla Kirwin in 1989 by Mike and Mary Ives. It was renamed KMFY-FM.  
In 2001, the station was sold to Mike and Cindy Iaizzo who renamed it Itasca Broadcasting. 
In 2012, KMFY-FM was sold to Jim and Colleen Lamke, who renamed it Lamke Broadcasting.  In November 2021, Lamke Broadcasting announced it had sold KMFY including its sister stations KBAJ and KOZY (AM) including FM translator K226CV 93.1 to Steve Hallstrom and Scott Hennen which they call themselves as Rapids Radio.

KMFY is a sister station to KOZY and KBAJ.

Line-Up
71m to 1pm- Kathy Lynn,  3-7pm- David Moody

Affiliations
KMFY-FM is affiliated with ABC News, Local Radio Networks, Minnesota News Network, Weatherology Weather Center, and the Vikings Radio Network.

External links

Mainstream adult contemporary radio stations in the United States
Radio stations in Minnesota
Grand Rapids, Minnesota